is a Japanese football player. He plays for Avispa Fukuoka.

Club statistics
Updated to 21 July 2022.

References

External links
Profile at FC Gifu
Profile at Thespakusatsu Gunma

1993 births
Living people
Ryutsu Keizai University alumni
Association football people from Chiba Prefecture
Japanese footballers
J2 League players
Thespakusatsu Gunma players
FC Gifu players
Montedio Yamagata players
Avispa Fukuoka players
Association football forwards
Association football midfielders